Carll Burr Jr. House is a historic home located at Commack in Suffolk County, New York. It is a -story, shingle and clapboard residence with a sweeping gable roof. It was built about 1895 and features a 3-story, three-bay tower with a tent roof. Also on the property is a contributing shed.

It was added to the National Register of Historic Places in 1985.

References

Houses on the National Register of Historic Places in New York (state)
Houses completed in 1895
Houses in Suffolk County, New York
National Register of Historic Places in Suffolk County, New York